The Batumi okrug was a district (okrug) of the Batum Oblast of the Russian Empire existing between 1878 and 1918. The district was eponymously named for its administrative center, the town of Batum (present-day Batumi), now part of Adjara within Georgia. The okrug bordered with the Artvin okrug in the south, the Ardahan okrug of the Kars Oblast to the southeast, the Tiflis Governorate to the northeast, the Kutaisi Governorate (of which it was a part in 1883–1903) to the north, and the Trebizond Vilayet of the Ottoman Empire to the west.

Administrative divisions 
The subcounties (uchastoks) of the Batumi okrug were:

Demographics

Russian Empire Census 
The majority of the population indicated Georgian to be their mother tongue, with significant Russian, Armenian and Greek speaking minorities.

Kavkazskiy kalendar 

Notes

References

Bibliography

See also 

 Kars Oblast
 Treaty of San Stefano
 Treaty of Berlin (1878)

 
Caucasus Viceroyalty (1801–1917)
Modern history of Georgia (country)
History of Adjara
19th century in Georgia (country)
1900s in Georgia (country)
1910s in Georgia (country)
States and territories established in 1878
States and territories disestablished in 1883
States and territories established in 1903
States and territories disestablished in 1917
1870s establishments in Georgia (country)
1917 disestablishments in Georgia (country)
1878 establishments in the Russian Empire
1880s disestablishments in the Russian Empire
1903 establishments in the Russian Empire
1917 disestablishments in Russia